Aliabad-e Shur (also known as ‘Alīābād-e Barkāl and ‘Alīābād) is a village in Kavir Rural District, Sheshtaraz District, Khalilabad County, Razavi Khorasan Province, Iran. At the 2006 census, its population was 385, in 95 families.

See also 

 List of cities, towns and villages in Razavi Khorasan Province

References 

Populated places in Khalilabad County